Ribosomal RNA-processing protein 7 homolog A is a protein that in humans is encoded by the RRP7A gene.

References

External links

Further reading

Genes on human chromosome 22